Negru Vodă can refer to:

 Radu Negru, a mythical early ruler of Wallachia
 Negru Vodă, Constanța, a town in Constanţa County